Phenol Charles is a former Haitian international football player. He is best known for scoring a hat-trick in the 1957 CCCF Championship match against Cuba in a 6-1 victory. The game was Haiti's final game of the Championship and the victory saw Haiti become the first Caribbean nation to win the title.

References

External links 

Profile at 11v11

Haitian footballers
Haiti international footballers
Association football forwards
Year of birth missing